Vincenzo "Enzo" Polito (born 29 October 1926) is an Italian water polo player who competed in the 1952 Summer Olympics. He was born in Naples. In 1952 he was part of the Italian team which won the bronze medal in the Olympic tournament. He played six matches.

See also
 List of Olympic medalists in water polo (men)

External links
 
 

1926 births
Possibly living people
Italian male water polo players
Water polo players at the 1952 Summer Olympics
Olympic bronze medalists for Italy in water polo
Medalists at the 1952 Summer Olympics
Water polo players from Naples